Lincoln Clay Lewis (born 24 October 1987) is an Australian actor. He is best known for his roles in the movie Tomorrow, When the War Began and in the television series Home and Away and Slide.

Early life
Lewis was born in Brisbane, Queensland. He is the son of Wally Lewis, an Australian former rugby league football captain and sports presenter on Nine News Queensland, and Jacqueline Lewis. Lewis has two siblings, an older brother Mitchell and a younger sister Jamie-Lee. He attended St Anthony's Catholic Primary School in Alexandra Hills and Carmel College in Thornlands. He also revealed that Wally and his brother (Lincoln's uncle) were butchers by trade.

Career
Lewis began acting at the age of thirteen. Lewis has since continued to appear in television shows such as H2O: Just Add Water, The Sleepover Club, Rescue: Special Ops and Mortified. In 2005 Lewis made his film debut in a bit role in the film Aquamarine. That same year Lewis starred in the low budget Australian horror film Voodoo Lagoon as Aaron. The film starred John Noble, Natalie Blair and Erika Heynatz and followed a group of college students who take a deadly vacation to a remote exotic island.

In 2007, Lewis was cast in the Seven Network soap opera Home and Away as Geoff Campbell. Lewis made his debut on the series in June 2007 and it is considered his breakout role. In 2008, Lewis won the Most Popular New Male Talent award at the 2008 Logie Awards. On June 5, 2009, it was announced Lewis would be one of the eleven celebrity contestants in the ninth series of Dancing with the Stars. On the same day of the aforementioned announcement, it was revealed that the 21-year-old Lewis had recorded a sex tape with an 18-year-old actress on his phone; the video was shown to some Home and Away colleagues but was not publicly disseminated. Lewis was eliminated from Dancing with the Stars on 23 August 2009, finishing in seventh place in the competition.

In September of that year, Lewis announced he was leaving Home and Away to pursue other opportunities. Lewis made his final appearance on 12 February 2010. To date he has appeared in 567 episodes of the show.

In mid-September 2009 Lewis was cast in the Paramount Pictures Action Adventure film Tomorrow, When the War Began. The film, which is an adaptation of the novel series of the same name, began production a week after Lewis' departure from Home and Away. Lewis portrayed the character Kevin Holmes and the film centres on a group of teenagers waging a guerrilla war against an invading foreign power in their fictional hometown of Wirrawee. The film was released in September 2010 to a mixed response from critics, but had large success with public audiences and went on to gross over $13 million in Australia alone. A sequel has been rumoured to be in the development stages and Lewis has expressed interest in returning.

In early 2010 Lewis starred in the Nine Network drama Rescue: Special Ops playing Sam Marchello, son of Vince Marchello, played by veteran Australian actor Peter Phelps. Lewis also starred in the independent drama film 33 Postcards alongside Guy Pearce and Claudia Karvan. The film went on to be the biggest release of an Australian film in China to date, receiving critical acclaim. Lewis also received the inaugural "Male Star of Tomorrow" Award at the 2011 Australian International Movie Convention on the Gold Coast.
In July 2010, Lewis once again joined the Nine Network to star in Crime Drama television series Underbelly: Razor as Bruce Higgs. The role required Lewis to perform his first onscreen nude scene.

In October 2010 it was announced that Lewis had been cast in the Australian ensemble horror film Bait 3D. The film, which also stars Xavier Samuel and Sharni Vinson, required Lewis to return to his home state Queensland. The film follows a group of people trapped in a supermarket with a group of great white sharks after a freak tsunami. 
In November 2010 Lewis was cast in a recurring role on the highly successful Foxtel Teen Drama television series SLiDE. Lewis portrayed the role of the temperamental older brother to Brenton Thwaites' character Luke Gallagher.

In September 2011 Ten Network announced Lewis had signed on to a four-week stint on the soap opera Neighbours. Lewis played the role of Dominic Emmerson, a marine biologist. Lewis received praise for his stint on the series with the Herald Sun saying his performance "brings a wonderful lightness of touch to his Neighbours role". Ten reportedly offered Lewis a one-year deal with the series to continue his role as a regular but Lewis declined.
 
In November 2011 Lewis was cast in a regular role on the Nine Network Drama television series Tricky Business. The series centres on a family that runs a debt collection business. Lewis plays the role of the womanising Chad Henderson, who usually finds himself in comedic dilemmas when pursuing clients. Nine ordered a 13-episode first season with plans to extend the season depending on the audiences' reception. The series premiere aired on 14 May 2012 to 1.16 million viewers.

In March 2012 it was announced that Lewis had been cast in his first international high-profile role after travelling to the US for the 2012–2013 television pilot season. Lewis appeared in the M. Night Shyamalan film After Earth, which was released in May 2013 and starred Will Smith and Jaden Smith. The film followed a father and son who crash land and explore a planet.

Early during the 2013 US Pilot season, Lewis was cast in ABC and Warner Bros. drama television pilot Westside directed by McG. The show revolves around the haves and have-nots of Venice, Los Angeles and focuses on two rival families battling over the surfing soul of Venice in a classic story of Romeo and Juliet, also starring Jennifer Beals and Bruce Greenwood. Westside however was not picked up to go to series.

In January 2014 it was announced that Lewis had been cast in the third season of Channel 9's highly popular family drama House Husbands and would begin filming in late January. On 3 March 2014 Channel 9 announced that while filming House Husbands Lewis had also been cast and had begun filming the World War 1 epic mini series Gallipoli, directed by Glendyn Ivin which aired in 2015.

In 2017, Lewis appeared as a celebrity contestant on the Australian version of Hell's Kitchen. Lewis was an ambassador for the 2020 MEN-tality project and Beyond Blue, raising awareness for mental health concerns amongst men alongside Rodger Corser, Human Nature, Alex Cubis and Lincoln Younes.

In 2021, during the 18th season of Dancing with the Stars, Lewis competed for a second season, finishing equal 3rd overall (out of 14 pairs). 

In 2022, Lewis will appear as a celebrity contestant on Lego Masters Australia Christmas special.

Filmography

Awards and nominations

References

External links

 
 

1987 births
Australian male film actors
Australian male television actors
Living people
Logie Award winners
Male actors from Brisbane
People from Redland City